Rotorua is a New Zealand parliamentary electorate, returning one Member of Parliament to the New Zealand House of Representatives. It was first established in 1919, and has existed continuously since 1954. The current MP for Rotorua is Todd McClay of the National Party, who won the electorate in the 2008 general election from incumbent Labour MP Steve Chadwick.

Population centres
In the 1918 electoral redistribution, the North Island gained a further three electorates from the South Island due to faster population growth. Only two existing electorates were unaltered, five electorates were abolished, two former electorate were re-established, and three electorates, including Rotorua, were created for the first time.

The original electorate, which was formed through the 1918 electoral redistribution, had a long coastline along the Bay of Plenty, and incorporated, beside Rotorua, the towns and villages of Whakatāne, Taupō, Tokoroa, Putāruru, Mangakino, Edgecumbe, Tāneatua, and Murupara. In the 1922 electoral redistribution, the electorate lost some area to the  electorate, and a larger area to the  electorate. The 1927 electoral redistribution saw Rotorua become landlocked, with the  electorate taking the coastline including Tāneatua and Edgecumbe, and Whakatāne going to the Bay of Plenty electorate. The electorate moved south and took in Lake Taupō, with Tūrangi just beyond the southern boundary located in the  electorate. The electorate also grew in the north-west, gaining the town of Matamata.

In the 1937 electoral redistribution, the electorate shifted further south again. Matamata was lost again, and the peaks of Tongariro, Ngauruhoe, and Ruapehu now formed the boundary to the Waimarino electorate. The 1946 electoral redistribution saw the Rotorua electorate abolished, with the Bay of Plenty electorate moving west and incorporating the town of Rotorua, most of the southern area going to the Waimarino electorate including the town of Taupō, and some area in the north-west going to the Waikato electorate including Tokoroa.

There was no adjustments in the number of electorates between the South and North Islands, but the law changes resulted in boundary adjustments to almost every electorate through the 1952 electoral redistribution; only five electorates were unaltered. Five electorates were reconstituted (including Rotorua) and one was newly created, and a corresponding six electorates were abolished; all of these in the North Island. The electorate was again landlocked and much smaller than prior to its abolition. Significant settlements included Rotorua, Tokoroa, Taupō, and Mangakino, with Lake Taupō forming the southern boundary.

Demographics 
Over forty per cent of the population of Rotorua is under the age of thirty, much of this because 37% of the electorate's residents are Māori, who are on the whole younger than the national average (22.7 years old versus a national average of 35.9). There are also fewer voters earning over $30,000 per year, with the majority of workers coming from working class and semi-skilled professionals. Rotorua also has more unemployed people (6.5%) than most electorates, being ranked 52nd in the nation.

The country quota applied until 1945 and the Rotorua electorate was initially classed as fully rural. Based on the 1926 New Zealand census, the 1927 Electoral Redistribution determined that 24% of the electorate's population was urban. Based on the 1936 census, the 1937 Electoral Redistribution determined that 36% of the electorate's population was urban.

The current Rotorua electorate is positioned in the Bay of Plenty region in the central North Island. It is dominated by the town of Rotorua, and also contains the Eastern Bay of Plenty towns of Kawerau, Murupara and Galatea, the last two of which are located on the outskirts of Te Urewera National Park. In 2008, its boundaries were extended to the geographical bay, with the addition of coastline stretching from a cluster of rural towns including Pukehina and Maketu to the outskirts of Te Puke.

History 

William Henry Wackrow was nominated in March 1922 as the opposition candidate for that year's election. Wackrow withdrew in November and was replaced by Cecil Clinkard, who lost against the incumbent, Frank Hockly of the Reform Party.

Lapwood served for six parliamentary terms and retired in 1978.

East also served six parliamentary terms until 1996. Both Tarawera and Rotorua were safe National Party electorates, and in the ensuing battle for the nomination, the two incumbents, East and Max Bradford, faced off for a Rotorua nomination eventually secured by Bradford, with East securing a high list position.

Bradford won the 1996 election with a nearly 6,000 votes margin. Chadwick's initial majority of 4,978 votes blew out to over 7,500 in 2002 before it was reined in to just 662 in 2005, as the National Party consolidated the centre-right vote, with its biggest gains being in the provincial North Island. In 2005, Chadwick's party was less popular than their candidate, coming 1,645 votes behind National.

In 2008 Chadwick was defeated by National candidate Todd McClay who won the electorate with a majority of 5,067 votes. In the 2011 election McClay again returned as the member for Rotorua, increasing his majority to 7,357 votes. In 2014, McClay was elected as MP for a third term beating television personality Tāmati Coffey by a similar majority to that in the previous election.

Rotorua is also an electorate where the New Zealand First party does well, with its biggest appeal among provincial New Zealanders, and as results in 1996 indicate, Māori: in the three most recent elections, New Zealand First has polled around three per cent higher in Rotorua than it did in the rest of New Zealand.

Members of Parliament for Rotorua 
Unless otherwise stated, all MPs terms began and ended at general elections.

Key

List MPs from Rotorua 
Members of Parliament elected from party lists in elections where that person also unsuccessfully contested the Rotorua electorate. Unless otherwise stated, all MPs terms began and ended at general elections.

Election results

2020 election

2017 election

2014 election

2011 election

Electorate (as at 26 November 2011): 42,886

2008 election

2005 election

2002 election

1999 election

1996 election

1993 election

1990 election

1987 election

1984 election

1981 election

1978 election

1975 election

1972 election

1969 election

1966 election

1963 election

1960 election

1957 election

1954 election

1943 election

1938 election

1935 election

1931 election

1928 election

1925 election

 
 
 
 
 
 

 

Table footnotes:

1922 election

1919 election

 
 
 
 
 
 
 

 

Table footnotes:

Notes

References

External links
Electorate Profile  Parliamentary Library

New Zealand electorates
Bay of Plenty Region
1919 establishments in New Zealand
1946 disestablishments in New Zealand
1954 establishments in New Zealand
Rotorua